Teach  may refer to:

People
 Blackbeard, English pirate Edward Teach (c. 1680–1718)
 nickname of Earl Caldwell (1905–1981), American Major League Baseball pitcher
 nickname of Eleanor Tennant (1895–1974), American tennis player and coach, first female professional player

Other uses
 Téach (or Tígh), an Irish language term referring to a home or residence
 Teach: Tony Danza, a reality show on A&E
 TEACH Act (Technology, Education and Copyright Harmonization Act), a 2002 American federal copyright act

See also
Teacher (disambiguation)

Lists of people by nickname